Adrian Paki Rurawhe (born 1961) is a New Zealand Labour Party politician of Ngāti Apa descent. He is the speaker of the New Zealand House of Representatives, the second Māori to hold the position, and Member of Parliament for Te Tai Hauāuru.

Family and professional career
Rurawhe is a grandson of Matiu and Iriaka Rātana, who were both Members of Parliament for the former Western Maori electorate from 1945 to 1969. He is a great-grandson of Rātana founder T. W. Ratana.

His grandfather died before he was born, and he was at secondary school before he was aware that his "Nan" was a Member of Parliament. Koro Wētere, the former Eastern Maori MP, encouraged his early involvement in politics and has been a mentor for Rurawhe.

Rurawhe has a background in health and education. He was the chairman of the Ngāti Apa iwi for ten years and was on the team that negotiated the 2011 treaty settlement with the Crown through the Waitangi Tribunal.

Political career

Rurawhe worked alongside Tariana Turia, to whom he is related, when she was still a member of the Labour Party. He was a member of the Māori Party between 2004 and 2008.

First term, 2014–2017

In his first term of Parliament, Labour was in Opposition and Rurawhe was appointed as the Labour Party spokesperson for civil defence and emergency management (2014–2015), internal affairs (2015–2017) and Treaty of Waitangi negotiations (2017). He was also junior whip after the election of Jacinda Ardern as Labour Party leader. 

In July 2015, Rurawhe introduced the Official Information (Parliamentary Under-Secretaries) Amendment Bill. Under the provisions of the bill, information held by parliamentary under-secretaries would be classified as official information and consequently subject to Official Information Act requests. The bill was passed into law with the support of all parties except New Zealand First and received royal assent in July 2016.

Second term, 2017–2020
During the 2017 general election, Rurawhe successfully retained Te Tai Hauāuru for Labour.

Following the formation of the Sixth Labour Government in October 2017, Rurawhe was elected to the office of assistant speaker. National Party MP Simon Bridges challenged Rurawhe's election to the Chair on grounds that Rurawhe's name was still on the door of the whip's office. Party whips are not eligible to be a presiding officer. Speaker Trevor Mallard ruled that a name on a door in Parliament is not binding on the House and that the speaker's office had already been notified in writing that Rurawhe was not a whip, so the election could proceed.

Third term, 2020–present
During the 2020 general election, Rurawhe won re-election, defeating the Māori Party's candidate, Debbie Ngarewa-Packer. When the official results were released, Rurawhe had a majority of 1,035, but after the Māori Party requested a recount in Te Tai Hauāuru, Rurawhe's majority increased slightly to 1,053. Following the election, Rurawhe was nominated as deputy speaker in the new Parliament, and was formally appointed to the role on 26 November.

As part of a cabinet reshuffle that occurred on 13 June 2022, Prime Minister Jacinda Ardern designated Rurawhe to replace Trevor Mallard as the next speaker of the House. It was also announced that Mallard would resign in mid-August 2022 to assume a diplomatic position in Europe. On 24 August Rurawhe was elected as speaker of the House with the support of both the governing and opposition parties, becoming the second Māori to hold the position. As speaker, Rurawhe promised to award opposition parties more opportunities to question Government ministers if the governing Labour Party did not shorten some of its answers to its parliamentary debate questions.

Political views 
Rurawhe voted against the End of Life Choice Act 2019 and against the Abortion Legislation Act 2020.

References

External links

Page on New Zealand Parliament website 
Page on Labour Party website

|-

Living people
New Zealand Labour Party MPs
Members of the New Zealand House of Representatives
Speakers of the New Zealand House of Representatives
1961 births
Ngāti Apa people
Māori Party politicians
New Zealand MPs for Māori electorates
21st-century New Zealand politicians
Candidates in the 2017 New Zealand general election
Candidates in the 2020 New Zealand general election